is a railway station in Aki-ku, Hiroshima, Hiroshima Prefecture, Japan.

Lines
West Japan Railway Company
Kure Line

Adjacent stations

|-
!colspan=5|JR West

Railway stations in Hiroshima Prefecture
Stations of West Japan Railway Company in Hiroshima city
Railway stations in Japan opened in 1903